Edwin Werter Higgins (July 2, 1874 – September 24, 1954) was an American politician and lawyer who served as a U.S. Representative from Connecticut from 1905 to 1912.

Biography 
Born in Clinton, Connecticut, Higgins attended Norwich Free Academy. He graduated from Yale Law School in 1897, having served as secretary of the Kent Club and been a member of Phi Sigma Kappa.

Higgins was admitted to the bar in 1897, and commenced practice in Norwich, Connecticut. He served as a member of the state house of representatives in 1899 and 1900, as well as a member of the Republican State Central Committee from 1900 to 1905. During the same period he was health officer of New London County. He also held the post of corporation counsel of Norwich in 1901, 1902, and from 1919 to 1922, served as prosecuting attorney of Norwich in 1905, and was a delegate to the Republican National Conventions in 1904 and 1916.

Higgins was elected as a Republican to the Fifty-ninth Congress to fill the vacancy caused by the resignation of Frank B. Brandegee. Reelected to the Sixtieth, Sixty-first, and Sixty-second Congresses and serving from October 2, 1905 until March 3, 1913, he was not a candidate for renomination in 1912, and resumed his law practice after leaving Congress. During the First World War, he served in the Connecticut State National Guard.

From 1932 to 1946 Higgins served as prosecuting attorney, Court of Common Pleas, Connecticut. He died in Norwich, Connecticut, on September 24, 1954, and was interred in Maplewood Cemetery.

References

1874 births
1954 deaths
Yale Law School alumni
Republican Party members of the United States House of Representatives from Connecticut